Henry Skipwith (1751-1815) was a member of the Virginia House of Delegates in 1782 and served in the American Revolutionary War.

Skipwith was a brother-in-law of Thomas Jefferson. They exchanged a number of letters archived by the United States National Archives and Records Administration.

Family
Skipwith married Anne Wayles on 7 July 1773. Anne Wayles was the child of John Wayles by his second wife. Martha Wayles, John Wayles' eldest daughter by his first wife, had married Thomas Jefferson in 1772, so Martha and Anne were half-sisters, making Skipwith and Jefferson brothers-in-law.

References

Members of the Virginia House of Delegates
1751 births
1815 deaths